The Ranaghat–Krishnanagar City–Lalgola line is a  long broad gauge railway line which connects Ranaghat Junction in the Nadia district with Lalgola in the Murshidabad district of the Indian state of West Bengal. The line runs up to the Bangladesh border near the Ganga river and is a part of the Sealdah railway division of the Eastern Railway zone.

Services 
There are three express services, which connect Lalgola with Kolkata (Hazarduari Express and Dhano Dhanye Express) and Sealdah (Bhagirathi Express), that traverse the entire length of the line connecting major towns like Krishnanagar and Berhampore in between. These services are further augmented by locomotive hauled passenger trains that stop at every station on the line. In 2012, daily MEMU services were started between Sealdah and Lalgola.

The Ranaghat–Krishnanagar City section along with the Kalinarayanpur–Shantipur–Krishnanagar City loop line is a part of the suburban section of the Kolkata Suburban Railway linking with the system at Ranaghat Junction. The Sealdah–Ranaghat–Krishnanagar City section is served with total pairs of 231 Daily and 187 Sunday EMU services. There are also 3 pairs of EMU services between Ranaghat and Krishnanagar via the Shantipur Loop line. Shantipur is further connected to Bangaon via the Ranaghat–Bangaon branch line with 2 pairs of daily EMU services.

A majority of the Sealdah–Ranaghat–Krishnanagar City section is served by 9-car EMU rakes from the Narkeldanga EMU Carshed. The Ranaghat EMU Carshed, commissioned in 2007, mainly serves the Bangaon–Ranaghat–Shantipur–Krishnanagar City section and the Ranaghat–Lalgola section, where EMU services were introduced from 2017, with 12-car EMU and MEMU rakes.

History

Pre–Partition

Ranaghat–Krishnanagar Light Railway 
While the main line of the eastern section of the Eastern Bengal Railway  was opened from Calcutta to Kushtia via Ranaghat in 1862, it bypassed Krishnanagar and Shantipur, two very prominent heritage centers of art, culture and learning of the 18th and 19th century Bengal. The administration of the Ranaghat–Krishnanagar Light Railway passed onto EBR in 1904.

Murshidabad Branch Railway 
EBR opened the Ranaghat–Murshidabad–Bhagwangola–Krishnapur branch line in 1905. This was known as the Murshidabad Branch Railway. This was further extended to Lalgola Ghat on the south bank of the Ganges in 1907 and the line came to be known as the Lalgola Ghat Branch Railway. In 1909, a metre gauge line from Katihar to Godagari Ghat (on the north bank of the Ganges), known as the Godagari Ghat Branch Railway was built, from where a ferry connection was established to Lalgola Ghat, thus providing a direct link from Katihar to Calcutta.

Further extensions 
in 1925. a broad gauge extension was built from Churni Bridge (present day Kalinarayanpur Junction railway station) to Shantipur thus establishing direct connectivity from Sealdah to Shantipur. This made the Aistala Ghat–Shantipur section and the Churni Extension Railway redundant following which they were dismantled and the line was known as Shantipur–Krishnanagar Light Railway.

The Shantipur–Krishnanagar Light Railway was extended up to Nabadwip Ghat on the east bank of the Bhagirathi river, in 1926 and a direct ferry connection was established to Nabadwip Dham, an important pilgrimage centre of Bengal.

This bridge was destroyed in the Second World War, leading to connectivity problems between the twin cities of Azimganj and Jiaganj located on the opposite sides of the Bhagirathi river.

Post-partition 
Following the partition of India in 1947, the link between Sealdah and Katihar via this line was snapped affecting the connection of South Bengal with North Bengal, North Bihar and Assam due to which the ferry connection was moved to between Sakrigali Ghat railway station in the Sahibganj Loop to Manihari Ghat railway station in the Katihar–Teznarayanpur branch line. The Katihar–Singhabad section was converted to broad gauge in 1962 with the construction of the new Howrah–New Jalpaiguri line.

The line along with other EBR lines came under the jurisdiction of the Sealdah railway division of the Eastern Railway post zonal re-organisation in 1952.

Gauge conversion 
The Shantipur–Krishnanagar City narrow gauge line was sanctioned for gauge conversion to broad gauge in 2001. The line closed for gauge conversion in 2010 which was completed and the new line was commissioned on 7 February 2012.

While the gauge conversion of the section has been completed from Krishnanagar City to Amghata railway station it has not been commissioned because of unauthorized crossings and the stretch between Amghata and Nabadwip Ghat has been blocked due to a temple and a mosque being on the alignment. Similarly while the bridge between Nabadwip Ghat and Nabadwip Dham over the Bhagirathi is ready, tracks leading to the bridge haven't been able to be built because of land acquisition problems and protests by the locals.

Nashipur rail bridge 
A new railway bridge between Azimganj and Murshidabad, across the Bhagirathi river was sanctioned in 2001 owing to a long time demand of the people of the area. While most of the work on the bridge has been completed since approach roads couldn't be built due to land acquisition problems and local protests, the tracks leading to the bridge couldn't be constructed because of which the connection to Murshidabad still lies incomplete, as of February 2021. Once completed Indian Railways plans to use it for the North bound trains from Sealdah like Darjeeling Mail as it provides a shorter route between Sealdah and New Jalpaiguri leading to significant savings in cost and time.

Track
The Ranaghat–Krishnanagar City–Lalgola section along with the Ranaghat–Shantipur section is a double line section while the Shantipur–Krishnanagar City section is a single line section.

Electrification
The Ranaghat–Krishnanagar City and the Ranaghat–Shantipur section was electrified in 1963–64. The single electrified line of the Shantipur–Krishnanagar City section was commissioned after gauge conversion in 2012.

EMU Carsheds 
The Ranaghat–Krishnanagar City section of the line is primarily served by 9-car EMU rakes from the Narkeldanga EMU Carshed with a few 12-car EMU rakes from Ranaghat EMU Carshed as well. Further to this most 12-car EMU rakes from Ranaghat EMU Carshed serve in the Ranaghat–Lalgola section and the Krishnanagar City–Shantipur–Ranaghat–Bangaon section. The Ranaghat EMU Carshed also maintains 12-car MEMU rakes which started serving from Sealdah to Lalgola in 2012.

While the section was initially served by the Narkeldanga EMU carshed which opened on 1963, due to the increasing traffic requirements in the Ranaghat–Gede, Ranaghat–Bangaon, Ranaghat–Shantipur–Krishnanagar City and Ranaghat–Lalgola sections owing to the electrification and gauge conversions of various lines, the Ranaghat EMU carshed was commissioned in 2007. EMU services were introduced between Ranaghat and Lalgola in 2017.

As of January 2023, the Narkeldanga carshed had 28 9-car EMU rakes, a few of which served the Sealdah South section mostly via the Circular line, while rest served the Sealdah North section lines. The Ranaghat EMU carshed contains 13 12-car EMU rakes and 8 12-car MEMU rakes. 4 of the 12-car MEMU rakes are three phase MEMU.

Routes and stations

Stations 

 Names in bold indicate that the station is a major stop or an important interchange/terminal station.
 Names in italics indicate that the station is now defunct

Ranaghat–Krishnanagar City–Lalgola main line

Shantipur loop line

Planned extensions 
There have been multiple demands for a new railway line from Krishnanagar to Berhampore via Karimpur and Domkal, two major towns in the Nadia and Murshidabad districts. While multiple surveys have been conducted for the proposed railway line since 1905, it was not sanctioned for construction. Two new railway line projects, Dhubulia–Charatala and Krishnanagar City–Chapra have been sanctioned in the railway budget in 2001 and 2002 respectively. While the final line survey of both the newly planned line has been completed there has been no further progress made in the project.

Gallery

References

External links

5 ft 6 in gauge railways in India
Rail transport in West Bengal